The  was an army of the Imperial Japanese Army during the final days of World War II.

History
The Japanese 55th Army was formed on April 8, 1945, under the Japanese 15th Area Army as part of the last desperate defense effort by the Empire of Japan to deter possible landings of Allied forces in Shikoku during Operation Downfall.  From June 15, the commander of the 55th Army was also commander in chief of all Japanese forces on Shikoku, and received his appointment directly from Emperor Hirohito.

The Japanese 55th Army was based in Kōchi city, Kōchi Prefecture. Despite its prestigious status of reporting directly to the emperor, as with other emergency army corps raised during this time, it consisted mostly of poorly trained and poorly armed reservists, conscripted students and Volunteer Fighting Corps home guard militia. It was demobilized at the surrender of Japan on  August 15, 1945, without having seen combat.

List of commanders

References

External links

55
Military units and formations established in 1945
Military units and formations disestablished in 1945